Alpha Eta Rho is a coed international professional college aviation fraternity that serves as a contact between the aviation industry and educational institutions. The fraternity strives to foster, promote, and mentor today's college students towards successful careers in aviation, aeronautical engineering, and aerospace sciences.  Alpha Eta Rho serves to actively associate interested students of aviation with leaders and executives in the industry. This close association, strengthened through the bonds of an international aviation fraternity, establishes opportunities for all members in their relation to aviation and inspires interest and cooperation among those in the profession who are also members of Alpha Eta Rho.

Established in 1929, it is the oldest professional aviation fraternity in history. Alpha Eta Rho has had over one hundred thirty five chapters both domestically and internationally. The Eta chapter at San Jose State University is the oldest active chapter, being founded on April 27, 1940. Currently over seventy chapters are active on campuses throughout the United States. The alumni of the fraternity are found in all facets of the aviation industry and related management fields. These include airline captains, military aviation flag officers, corporate CEOs, NASA engineers, flight attendants, aircraft mechanics, aviation museum directors, aerospace engineers, and pilots. There are currently 42 active chapters at colleges and universities, and over 45,000 alumni. Alpha Eta Rho accepts over 1,000 new members each year.

Scholarships are available to active members on a yearly basis.

Alpha Eta Rho is incorporated in the state of Missouri, and is a non-hazing organization.

Fraternity values
Mission:
To enlighten the serious aerospace student on the facts concerning all fields directly related to aerospace
To unite people with an interest in aviation and to share opinions and views on aviation subject matter

Purposes:
To further the cause of aviation in all of its branches
To instill in the public mind a confidence in aviation and its safety
To promote contacts between the students of aviation and those engaged in the profession
To promote a close affiliation between the students of aviation for the purposes of education and research in the field
To maintain and promote the highest moral standards as members of this unique fraternity

Fundamental tenets:
 It shall be the bounden duty of every member to aid and encourage his fellow pilots in every manner possible.
 Every pilot of Alpha Eta Rho shall bend his earnest efforts to the advancement of the profession.
 Each member shall strive at all times to create goodwill toward aeronautics through the implantation in the public mind of a confidence to be built up by the presentation of facts in their proper light.
 The upholding and advancement of the ethics of aviation shall be a basic aim of each individual member.
 Each pilot shall at all times so conduct himself as to reflect honor upon his profession, his fraternity, and himself.

Notable alumni
Joe Leonard - AirTran Airways CEO
JP Lake - (CEO) Flyjetz
Fernando Pineda - (Executive Vice President) NICHOLAS AIR

Chapters

See also

 Professional fraternities and sororities

References

Professional fraternities and sororities in the United States
Student organizations established in 1929
1929 establishments in California